Marjana is a feminine given name. It could refer to:

Marjana Bremec Homar (born 1946), Slovenian basketball player
Marjana Chowdhury (born 1993), Bangladeshi-American model, actress, and beauty queen
Marjana Gaponenko (born 1981), Ukrainian-German writer
Marjana Ivanova-Jevsejeva (born 1982), Latvian politician
Marjana Lipovšek (born 1946), Slovenian opera singer
Marjana Lubej (born 1945), Slovenian sprinter
Marjana Maraš (born 1970), Serbian politician
Marjana Naceva (born 1994), Macedonian footballer

See also
Mirjana, a Slavic feminine given name
Marijana, a Slavic feminine given name

Feminine given names
Slovene feminine given names